The Tatra 158 Phoenix is a heavy truck made by the Czech company Tatra, produced since 2011, with axle variations of 4×4, 6×6, 8×8 and 10×10. The truck was developed in cooperation with the DAF Trucks company.

Phoenix is Tatra's main general purpose vehicle intended for civilian customers, while model T817 is intended primarily for military users.

Description
For the Tatra 158 Phoenix model line, Tatra does not use air-cooled engines of its own design, but uses Paccar MX engines, according to the emissions standards of Euro 3, Euro 5, and since 2015 with Euro 6.

Standard is the 16-speed gearbox ZF, manual or automatic. The auxiliary transmission is of Tatra's own construction. The vehicle is built on the Tatra-concept chassis. Angle of approach is at 31°, this is one of the best values of the approach angle among off-road all-wheel drive trucks.

The Tatra Phoenix won second place in the European Truck of the Year 2012 competition. At Silva Regina 2012 exhibit in Brno has been awarded by the “Extraordinary Award of the CEO and Jury".

The first Tatra Phoenix Euro 6 vehicles appeared in operation in early 2015. They have new facelifted cabins designed by DAF (again in Day or Sleeper Cab versions) and a completely reconstructed cabin floor.

Specifications 
 motors: turbocharged Paccar MX 11 or MX 13
 displacement: 10.8 or 12.9 L
 max. power :  @ 1750 rpm
 max. torque :  @ 1425 rpm
 top speed: 85 km/h
 fuel tank capacity: 345 l
 angle of approach: 31°

References

Tatra 158 Phoenix
Cars of the Czech Republic
Military trucks
All-wheel-drive vehicles
Trucks of the Czech Republic
Vehicles introduced in 2011